Titanodula fruhstorferi is a praying mantis species in the subfamily Hierodulinae.

This species may be endemic to Vietnam.

Taxonomy 
T. fruhstorferi was originally placed in Hierodula, but a 2020 study moved the species to a new genus, Titanodula, based on its large size and the unique shape of the male genitalia.

References

External links 

fruhstorferi
Mantodea of Asia
Insects of Vietnam
Insects described in 1916